Groß Oesingen is a municipality in the district of Gifhorn, in Lower Saxony, Germany. The Municipality Groß Oesingen includes the villages of Groß Oesingen, Klein Oesingen, Mahrenholz, Schmarloh, Texas and Zahrenholz.

References

Gifhorn (district)